Drago Grubelnik (15 January 1976 – 17 November 2015) was Slovenian alpine skier and coach.

Born in Radlje ob Dravi, Grubelnik made the podium in one event on the Alpine Skiing World Cup, a third place in slalom in Wengen, Switzerland (January 2000). He competed at the 1998, 2002 and 2006 Winter Olympics. He retired from competitive sport in 2007. Prior to his death in November 2015, Grubelnik was the head coach of the Bulgarian ski team.

Grubelnik died in a car accident in Sölden. He was 39.

World Cup results

Season standings

Race podiums

References

External links
  – Olympic results

Slovenian male alpine skiers
1976 births
2015 deaths
Alpine skiers at the 1998 Winter Olympics
Alpine skiers at the 2002 Winter Olympics
Alpine skiers at the 2006 Winter Olympics
Olympic alpine skiers of Slovenia
People from the Municipality of Radlje ob Dravi
Road incident deaths in Austria